The second season of Lois & Clark: The New Adventures of Superman originally aired between September 18, 1994, and May 21, 1995, beginning with "Madame Ex".

The series loosely follows the comic philosophy of writer John Byrne, with Clark Kent as the true personality, and Superman as a secondary disguise. As the show's title suggests, it focuses as much on the relationship between Clark Kent and Lois Lane on the adventures of Clark's alter-ego. The central characters in season 2 are Dean Cain as Clark Kent/Superman, Teri Hatcher as Lois Lane, Lane Smith as Perry White, Eddie Jones as Jonathan Kent, K Callan as Martha Kent, Justin Whalin as Jimmy Olsen.

Season two dropped the character of Cat Grant and replaced Michael Landes with Justin Whalin as Jimmy Olsen. The official reason, according to Landes, was that he looked too similar to Dean Cain (on the DVD commentary for the pilot of Lois & Clark, Dean Cain has admitted that he and Landes looked like they could be related). Series creator Deborah Joy LeVine and the entire first-season writing team were also dismissed. The new producer, Robert Singer, planned a stronger focus on "action"; the show also focused more on the budding romance of Lois and Clark.

Lex Luthor returned in one episode and many other villains began to appear from the comics, such as The Prankster, Metallo, the Toyman and the criminal group known as Intergang, and the show featured new love interests for the ace reporters: Dan Scardino played by Jim Pirri, a government agent interested in Lois, and D. A. Mayson Drake played by Farrah Forke. This season also featured the debut of fan-favorite villain Tempus played by Lane Davies and H. G. Wells, as a time-traveler. Wells' younger self was played by Terry Kiser, and the older Wells was played by Hamilton Camp. Season two started out rocky but became a success and garnered higher ratings in its initial airings, ending the season in 58th place. The season ended with the cliffhanger of Clark proposing marriage to Lois.

Episodes

See also 

 List of Lois & Clark: The New Adventures of Superman episodes

References

External links 
 Season 2 at the IMDb

1994 American television seasons
1995 American television seasons
Lois & Clark: The New Adventures of Superman seasons